Diego de Medellín, O.F.M. (1496 – November 1592) was a Roman Catholic prelate who served as Bishop of Santiago de Chile (1574–1592).

Biography
Diego de Medellín was born in Medellín, Spain in 1496 and ordained a priest in the Order of Friars Minor.
On 18 June 1574, he was appointed during the papacy of Pope Gregory XIII as Bishop of Santiago de Chile.
In 1577, he was consecrated bishop by Antonio Avendaño y Paz, Bishop of Concepción, assisted by Agustín de Cisneros Montesa, Priest of Concepción. 
He served as Bishop of Santiago de Chile until his death in November 1592. 
While bishop, he was the principal consecrator of Agustín de Cisneros Montesa, Bishop of Concepción (1590); and the principal co-consecrator of Alfonso Guerra, Bishop of Paraguay (1582)

References 

16th-century Roman Catholic bishops in Chile
Bishops appointed by Pope Gregory XIII
1496 births
1592 deaths
Franciscan bishops
Roman Catholic bishops of Santiago de Chile